The Hurricane Mountain Fire Observation Station is a historic fire observation station located on Hurricane Mountain at Keene in Essex County, New York. The tower is a prefabricated structure built by the Aermotor Corporation to provide a front line of defense in preserving the Adirondack Park from the hazards of forest fires.

It was added to the National Register of Historic Places in 2007.

References

External links

 360 degree interactive panorama from inside the lookout
The Fire Towers of New York

Government buildings on the National Register of Historic Places in New York (state)
Infrastructure completed in 1919
Towers completed in 1919
Buildings and structures in Essex County, New York
Fire lookout towers in Adirondack Park
Fire lookout towers on the National Register of Historic Places in New York (state)
National Register of Historic Places in Essex County, New York